Balducci's Food Lover's Market is a mid-Atlantic specialty gourmet food retailer in the United States with eight grocery stores, owned by Albertsons since 2020.

History 
The Balducci family patriarch, Louis, an immigrant from Bari, Italy, began his family's career in the New York City food trade by selling fruits and vegetables from a pushcart in Greenpoint, Brooklyn between 1914 and 1925. The family returned to Italy in 1925, returned to the United States in 1939 and in 1946 Louis and his wife Maria opened a fruit stand at the corner of Christopher Street and Greenwich Avenue in Greenwich Village. In 1972, they moved across Sixth Avenue into a storefront at Sixth and West 9th St.

From that site on Sixth Avenue, Balducci's is considered to have been the first grocer in New York City to sell premium quality foods with a butcher, fishmonger, delicatessen and greengrocer all in the same store. It became a model for specialty markets all over the city.

When the store moved to Sixth Avenue it was owned by two of Louis and Maria's children, Andy (and his wife Nina) and Grace (and her husband, Joe Doria). (A third child, Charles, was a physician; his son, Louis B., was active in managing the store.) News accounts describe disputes between the three siblings and their father Louis. In 1985 Grace and Joe left the company to start Grace's Marketplace on the Upper East Side. Louis B. left in the late 1980s and became partner at Agata & Valentina, another specialty grocer on Upper East Side.

With their daughters uninterested in taking over the store, Andy and Nina sold in 1999 for $26.5 million to Sutton Place Gourmet, a Maryland-based company. Sales for the combined company were more than $130 million per year.

The flagship store in on Sixth Avenue in Greenwich Village closed in January 2003 but a branch store, on West 66th Street, remained open.

In November 2003, the company was purchased by an investment group led by Bear Stearns Merchant Banking.

(Separate from the history of the store, but part of the family's history in food, Andy and Nina's daughter Ria's husband Kevin Murphy left Balducci's and started Baldor Specialty Foods, an East-Coast produce distributor. The name Baldor is said to be a combination of the names Balducci and Doria.)

Balducci's after 2005

The new flagship store on Eighth Avenue at 14th Street in Manhattan opened in December 2005. Following its opening, Local 1500 of the United Food and Commercial Workers Union began protesting outside the store against the non-unionized status of employees. In April 2006 the company closed its two New York City locations, the new flagship at Eighth Avenue and 14th Street and the West 66th Street store.

"Right now we are restructuring our company," said Jennifer Barton, Marketing Director with Balducci's LLC. "We had to close some of our under-performing stores."

There are currently eight full-service retail stores in Connecticut, Maryland, Virginia, and New York (Scarsdale). In 2012, Balducci's returned to New York with Balducci's Gourmet on the Go Café in Hearst Tower, which serves prepared meals and soups as well as a gourmet salad and coffee bar. There are four Balducci's Express locations:  three in JFK Airport in New York and one at the Leesburg Corner Premium Outlets in Virginia. There is also a Balducci's Gourmet on the Go Café located in the Bloomberg Children's Center at the Johns Hopkins Hospital.

In April 2009 Balducci's was sold to Kings Food Markets, a portfolio company of Angelo, Gordon and Co. In 2016, Kings and Balducci's were sold to GSSG Capital. In 2020, Balducci's filed for bankruptcy, and was sold to Albertsons.

In fiction
In the television sitcom, Will and Grace, the character Will Truman regularly visited the original Greenwich Village store in New York before it was closed in 2003.

In a scene from the movie Fatso, the character Dominick Anthony "Dom" DiNapoli, played by actor Dom DeLuise, visits a weight-loss clinic with a bag of groceries from Balducci's.

In a scene of the movie 25th Hour, the character Montgomery "Monty" Brogan, played by Edward Norton, mentions Balducci's in his soliloquy in front of the mirror.

In Larry Kramer's play The Normal Heart, set in the 1980s, characters Ned and Felix eat Balducci's Gourmet Ice Cream, which they say cost $18 per pint.

In a scene from the 2006 movie Just My Luck, the character Ashley Albright, played by Lindsay Lohan, brings a bag of Balducci's pastries to work for her friends.

In a scene from the 1998 romantic comedy film The Object of My Affection, characters Sidney Miller (Alan Alda), George Hanson, (Paul Rudd), Nina Borowski (Jennifer Aniston), Constance Miller (Allison Janney), and Vince McBride (John Pankow) gather in the kitchen enjoying gourmet foods from Balducci's at a kitchen table, apparent from the Balducci's paper grocery bags Vince McBride brings to Nina and George's apartment in Brooklyn for dinner.

In the 1991 movie The Prince of Tides starring Nick Nolte and Barbra Streisand, comedian George Carlin walks into Nolte's apartment with a Balducci's bag and places it on the counter.

The 2000 song "I Got Cash" by Brooklyn Funk Essentials includes the lines, "Choke to death on your damn designer bagel from Balducci's / Low cholesterol, naturally."

References

External links
balduccis.com, Balducci's Food Lovers Market official website

Greenwich Village
Shops in New York City
Companies based in Germantown, Maryland
Economy of the Eastern United States
Supermarkets of the United States
Commercial buildings in Manhattan
American companies established in 1946
Retail companies established in 1946
Food and drink companies established in 1946
1946 establishments in New York City
Food and drink companies based in Maryland
Companies that filed for Chapter 11 bankruptcy in 2020